Calliclinus is a genus of labrisomid blennies native to the Pacific and Atlantic coasts of southern South America.

Species
There are currently two recognized species in this genus:
 Calliclinus geniguttatus (Valenciennes, 1836)
 Calliclinus nudiventris Cervigón & Pequeño, 1979

References

 
Labrisomidae
 
Ray-finned fish genera